Nkaya, also known as Nacaia, is a town in Malawi, located in the district of Balaka and in the Southern Region of the country.

Its economy is predominantly agricultural, but it has an important logistics sector, as it serves as the junction point of the country's road-rail systems.

Transport 

The city's railway station serves as the junction of the national railway network, between the Sena railway and the Nacala railway.

See also 

 Railway stations in Malawi

References 

Populated places in Southern Region, Malawi